James Smith (born 1948) is an English actor. Smith is best known for his part in 22 episodes of the BBC's The Thick of It as senior special adviser Glenn Cullen, from 2005 to 2012. He also featured as Michael Rodgers, Director of Diplomacy at the Foreign Office, in the film spin off In the Loop.

In 2010 Smith played Clive in all 12 episodes of the BBC comedy Grandma's House. He also took a supporting role as Lord Carrington in the 2011 film The Iron Lady. In 2014 he appeared in all 13 episodes of Boomers as Trevor.

He played Graham Watkins in the 2017 mockumentary, Carnage. In 2018, he played the principal role of Sidney Godolphin, 1st Earl of Godolphin in Yorgos Lanthimos's film The Favourite.

Politics and personal life
In October 2012, Smith compered a rally organised by the Trades Union Congress against government cuts.

Smith has three children and nine grandchildren. He was in a relationship with a woman for 30 years until she died in 1998, and later began a new relationship in the early 2010s. Smith is an amateur bridge player and drummer.

References

External links

1948 births
Living people
English male television actors